Gulyana (Urdu: ,) is a town in the Gujar Khan Tehsil of Rawalpindi District, in the Punjab province of Pakistan. Gulyana is also chief town of Union Council Gulyana which is an administrative subdivision of the Tehsil.

It is the village and union councils of Gujarkhan. It is approximately 62 km (70 km by road) southeast of Islamabad, the capital of Pakistan and 215 km to the north west of Lahore capital of Punjab. The town has a population of approximately 25,000. Gulyana lies at the bank of the sinuous river. It is also the Pothohari cultural region. The area has considerable literate human resources which works in nearby Gujarkhan & Rawalpindi. Ogah Hoon dam also serves fertile land of Gulyana. A private textile mill also increases its importance in the region.

History

Gulyana was approximately 900 years old when Gul Mohammad settled there; it is named for him. Historically before partition Gulyana was the trade centre for surrounding areas. Before the Partition of India Gulyana was the renowned place and Tehsildar office was operating here in Gulyana with judicial, but because of G.T ROAD Gujarkhan became a judicial place. The central peak point called Pind was used for the traders to announce the arrival of new goods, in 1960 and early 1970 "LITTO" a drum beater used to announce at Pind.

Occupations
80% of the population depends on agriculture. Lands of that area are very fertile. Main Crops are: wheat, millet, peanuts and other pulses.

Major industries
 Chicken and fish farming
 Vegetable and fruits farming
 Milk production animals farming
 Pottery

Hospital
Gulyana has one main Govt. dispensary. Private hospitals and healthcare units are also working in the town. Lady health workers are also working with other Govt. Basic Health Units in the area.

Gulyana River
Gulyana river locally called as Kass (کس) flows sinuously around the area from west to east. It is one of many supporting rivers for Jhelum River. It is a typical semi-arid rain river which flows around the area with floods during monsoon season. Young river starts from village Muradi Janjeel (مرادی جنجیل) covering other villages like Sukho(سکھو). Small supporting rivers which start from areas near Mandra–Chakwal Road also add up more water in it. Before reaching gulyana it fills up Ogha Hun Dam. 
It flows sinuously making a W-shape around Gulyana and creates typical potohari landscape. The river flows further and crosses GT Road near Bhai Khan city (بھائ خان). It joins another river called kanshi (کانسی) which flows around north east villages of Gujar Khan tehsil. The river drainage basin finishes at Mangla Dam on Jhelum river.

Ogha Hun Dam
Ogha Hun Dam was built on the Gulyana River (Kass) and is located 4km (5km by road) away from the main town. It provides Gulyana's seasonal corps with enough supply of water through canalgulyana

Telecommunication
The PTCL provides the main network of landline telephone. Many ISPs and all major mobile phone, Wireless companies operating in Pakistan provide service in Gulyana.

Education
 Government high school (boys)
 Government high school (girls)
 Government primary school (boys)
 Government primary school (girls)

See also

 Rawalpindi District
 Gujar Khan Tehsil
 List of people from Gujar Khan

References

 ^ a b c Stefan Helders. "World Gazzeteer". https://archive.today/20130210085056/http://www.world-gazetteer.com/wg.php?x=&men=gpro&lng=en&dat=32&geo=-172&srt=npan&col=aohdq&pt=a&va=x&geo=443761330. Retrieved on 2007-07-02.
 ^ Election Commission of Pakistan. "Zila, Tehsil & Town Councils Membership for Punjab". https://web.archive.org/web/20090304160001/http://www.ecp.gov.pk/content/zttc/townpunjab.htm. Retrieved on 2007-07-02.
 ^ Population Census Organization, Government of Pakistan. "List of Administrative Units of Pakistan (Tehsil/Taluka)". http://www.statpak.gov.pk/depts/pco/statistics/admin_unit/admin_list_tehsil.html. Retrieved on 2007-07-02.
 ^ "Election Commission of Pakistan". https://web.archive.org/web/20120217184209/http://www2.ecp.gov.pk/vsite/ElectionResult/AllResults.aspx?assemblyid=NA.
 ^ Towns & Unions in the City District of Rawalpindi
 ^ 1998 Census details - Official website of Rawalpindi District
 ^ Asia Times Online (Holdings) Ltd. "Business in Asia". http://www.atimes.com/bizasia/DB22Aa01.html . Retrieved on 2007-07-02.
 ^ Gulyana Full Info. "Gulyana". http://www.facebook.com/gulyanaa Retrieved on 2019-07-05.

Union councils of Gujar Khan Tehsil